Jacob Zambuhle Bhekuyise Dlamini  was the last Bishop of St John's to hold that title throughout his episcopate. He studied for the priesthood at St Bede’s College Umtata and was ordained deacon in 1961 and priest two years later. He began his career with posts within the Diocese of Zululand before becoming Archdeacon of Empangeni. In 1985 he was elevated to the  episcopate and made important changes, notably in 1991 the creation of a new diocese (Umzimvubu) within part of St John's. A committed evangelist he retired in 2000, shortly after chairing a synod on the church leadership's social responsibility to the underprivileged.

Notes 

South African humanitarians
Anglican bishops of St John's
20th-century Anglican Church of Southern Africa bishops
Living people
Year of birth missing (living people)